Voice Over is a 2014 Chilean drama film directed by Cristián Jiménez. It was selected to be screened in the Contemporary World Cinema section at the 2014 Toronto International Film Festival.

Plot
Sofía is a 35-year-old woman living in Valdivia, Chile. She has two children and has just gone through a separation. Her breakup is compounded by the frustration of not being able to work and dedicate herself to her profession, acting. Additionally, she and her sister Ana face the dilemma of uncovering the mystery of their father after he leaves home and abandons their mother.

Cast
 Ingrid Isensee as Sofia
 María José Siebald as Ana
 Paulina García as Matilde
 Niels Schneider as Antoine
 Maite Neira as Alicia
 Cristián Campos as Manuel
 Lucas Miranda as Roman

References

External links
 

2014 films
2014 drama films
Chilean drama films
2010s Spanish-language films
2010s Chilean films